This is a list of defunct airlines of Ecuador.

See also
 List of airlines of Ecuador
 List of airports in Ecuador

References

Ecuador
Airlines
Airlines, defunct